Shree Brahma Baidarkala Garadi Kshetra  or popularly known as Garodi is a temple in Mangalore dedicated to the twin cultural heroes of Tulu Nadu region, Koti and Chennayya (Circa 1556 A.D to 1591 A.D.).The temple is located at Kankanadi adjacent to the Mangalore-Bangalore highway just 4 km away from the heart of Mangalore. This temple is of much significance to the Tuluva community.

References 

Hindu temples in Mangalore